Rana Farhan is an Iranian musician and singer of jazz and blues. After graduating from Tehran University, she left Iran in 1989, and has been living in New York since then.

Career
Born in Iran, Rana grew up listening to any albums she could get her hands on, fostering a love for American blues artists like Odetta and Lead Belly; while rockin' to Jimi Hendrix and Janis Joplin. Rana left Iran after graduating from Tehran University and she soon found herself in New York City, exploring her talents in lacquer paintings and soaking in the sounds and music of Manhattan, including the rich cultural district of Harlem where she discovered her love of jazz.

Farhan sings in a bluesy style that is an exploration of combining classic Persian poetry with modern jazz and blues.

Recording albums
In 2005 she teamed with guitarist/producer Steven Toub for her first full-length CD, "The Blues Are Brewin'", a collection of American jazz and blues standards. Farhan's second release, "I Return", combined classical Persian poetry with contemporary blues and jazz music and established a model to the jazz fusion project that she continues to incorporate in her work. After positive reception from an independently-circulating single called "Rumi's Prayer", she collaborated with Taub once again to create an album of songs that featured the poetry of major poets such as Rumi and Hafez. She received critical acclaim from one track in particular off that album, "Drunk with Love", which has been used in a variety of places, from being sung by contestants on the Iranian version of American Idol to Bahman Ghobadi's 2009 film No One Knows About Persian Cats (Kasi az Gorbehaye Irani Khabar Nadareh).

Her 2011 album, "Moon and Stone," is an expressive tribute to soul music. She held a major album release party at New York's DROM for the 2014 recording "Attar Boulevard"

Visual art
Farhan also does gilding and paints miniatures, both using very traditional forms and using these techniques to create abstract compositions.

Appearances

Rana has been featured on BBC Persian, Manoto, Voice of America, Suzi Khatami's "Live From Hollywood" KIRN 670 AM Los Angeles, dw-world.de German radio with Shahram Ahadi, "Taraneyeh Nasorudeh" with Farid Vahabi RFI Radio France International, Voice of America radio Farda, Homa Sarshar's "Khaaneh-ye doost" 670AM Los Angeles, the Kook entertainment show with Behzad Bolour for BBC Persia, Sholeh Sadr sbs radio from Melbourne Australia, "Saba: Wind of Love" 90.1 FM KKFI Kansas City Radio, "The Upper Room with Joe Kelly" WVOF 88.5 FM in Fairfield CT, "Persian Hour" with Shahrokh Nikfar KYRS 92.3 FM in Spokane Washington, and Buenos Aires' "Goodtime Blues Show" in Argentina.
She has also appeared on Bebin TV in Los Angeles with Melissa Shoshahi and Voice of America/Persian TV's Shabahang.

Discography
2007 : I Return (Baz Amadam)
2009 : Your Wish (Arezoo-Ye To)
2011 : Moon and Stone (Mah-o Sang)
2014 : Attar Boulevard
2018 : Talkin' About Love

References

External links
 Official website

21st-century Iranian women singers
Exiles of the Iranian Revolution in the United States
University of Tehran alumni
Living people
Jazz-blues musicians
Iranian blues singers
Year of birth missing (living people)